Joan-Emma Shea is an American chemist who is a professor at the University of California, Santa Barbara. Her research considers chaperone-mediated protein folding. She is a Fellow of both the American Physical Society and the American Chemical Society, and the Editor-in-Chief of the Journal of Physical Chemistry.

Early life and education 
Shea was born in Santa Barbara, California. She was an undergraduate student at McGill University and a doctoral student at the Massachusetts Institute of Technology, where her research considered Brownian motion. She was awarded a National Sciences and Engineering Research Council of Canada fellowship, and joined Charles L. Brooks III at the University of California, San Diego and Scripps Research.

Research and career 
Shea joined the James Franck Institute at the University of Chicago in 2000, where she spent one year before joining the University of California, Santa Barbara. She was made a Professor at the University of California, Santa Barbara in 2008. Her work considers the chemistry of cellular processes, including in vivo protein folding. In particular, she studies intrinsically disordered proteins, proteins which do not fold to a unique shape. These proteins self-assemble into structures which become toxic to the cell, resulting in neurodegenerative diseases. For example, the formation of fibrillar aggregates of Tau protein have been linked to Alzheimer's disease. She has shown that certain proteins, including the Tau protein, undergo liquid-liquid phase separation, which may serve to protect the cell from fibrillization.

In 2019, Shea was made Editor-in-Chief of the Journal of Physical Chemistry (A, B and C). She was the first woman to hold this position in the 124 year history of the journal.

Awards and honors 
 2002 National Science Foundation CAREER Award
 2003 David and Lucile Packard Award
 2004 Alfred P. Sloan Research Fellow
 2011 Elected Fellow of the American Physical Society
 2022 Elected Fellow of the American Chemical Society

Selected publications

References 

American women chemists
1972 births
Living people
21st-century American chemists
University of California, Santa Barbara faculty
People from Santa Barbara, California
Fellows of the American Chemical Society
Fellows of the American Physical Society
McGill University alumni
Massachusetts Institute of Technology alumni
Chemistry journal editors
21st-century American women scientists